The 2014 AON Open Challenger was a professional tennis tournament played on clay courts. It was the eleventh edition of the tournament which was part of the 2014 ATP Challenger Tour. It took place in Genoa, Italy, between 1 and 7 September 2014.

Singles main-draw entrants

Seeds

 1 Rankings are as of August 25, 2014.

Other entrants
The following players received wildcards into the singles main draw:
  Alessandro Giannessi 
  Gianluca Mager 
  Francesco Picco
  Matteo Trevisan

The following players entered into the singles main draw as alternates:
  Mate Delić
  Uladzimir Ignatik

The following player entered into the singles main draw as a special exemption:
  Viktor Troicki

The following players received entry from the qualifying draw:
  Viktor Galović 
  Jozef Kovalík 
  Gianluca Naso 
  Adelchi Virgili

Champions

Singles

 Albert Ramos def.  Mate Delić 6–1, 7–5

Doubles

 Daniele Bracciali /  Potito Starace  def.  Frank Moser /  Alexander Satschko 6–3, 6–4

External links
Official Website

AON Open Challenger
AON Open Challenger
2014 in Italian tennis
September 2014 sports events in Europe
21st century in Genoa